Chard (1964) Ltd, operating as Chard Coin and Bullion Dealer, is a long-standing coin and bullion dealer based in Blackpool, UK. Its coins range from ancient to modern-day issues. Originally a numismatic company, it grew into the bullion market, offering gold, silver, platinum and palladium products to an international customer base.

History 
Chard (1964) Ltd operates as Chard Coin and Bullion Dealer. Established in the resort town of Blackpool in 1964 by Lawrence Chard, the company at first traded shillings and other coins from Chard's grandmother's amusement arcade, but over the years Chard amassed a vast collection of world coins, coin sets, bars, medallions, stamp replicas, and other currency and collectibles. Chard's provides freely available numismatic, bullion and investment advice to coin collectors and investors in person or via its websites.

In 2014, Chard Coin and Bullion celebrated its 50th anniversary with a move to 32-36 Harrowside, Blackpool. The art deco building was gutted and rebuilt to provide security.

Service 
Chard sells its items, including physical bullion, in its Blackpool showroom and on its website. Chard specialises in British gold sovereigns and has over 5,000 dated and graded sovereigns in its collection. In addition to precious metals, Chard also deals in bullion, numismatic material and scrap gold.

Awards 
Chard was awarded the UK Bullion Dealer of the Year award by Bullion Directory in 2018, 2017, 2016 and 2015. It has also been named Numismatic Dealer of the Year and eCommerce Dealer of the Year multiple times.

References

Further reading
 The Guardian "Gold can be a big deal for small investors, but nothing is certain" Retrieved 02.11.2022
 Daily Mirror "Lucky puppy digs up treasure trove of £6,000 gold coins on his first ever walk in park" Retrieved 02.11.2022
 Blackpool Gazette "Blackpool bullion firm retains award" Retrieved 19.03.2018
 Blackpool Gazette "Bullion dealers celebrate their 50 golden years" Retrieved 15.12.2014
 Coin Update "Interview: Lawrence Chard, Head of Historic Chard Ltd in Blackpool, U.K." Retrieved 20.01.2017
 Lancashire Business View "Golden Anniversary For Blackpool Bullion Company" 
 Moneyweek "How and where to buy gold coins and bars" Retrieved 19.05.2014 
 Business Lancashire "Chard of Blackpool are voted the 2017 UK Bullion Dealer of the Year" Retrieved 09.03.2017
 ShareRadio "Lawrence Chard on the Surge in Online Sales of Coins" Retrieved 02.11.2022

External links 
 Official Chard Coin and Bullion Website

.

Financial services companies established in 1964
Companies based in Lancashire
Bullion dealers
British numismatists
1964 establishments in England